Events in the year 1948 in India.

Incumbents
 Governor-General of the Union of India – The Viscount Mountbatten of Burma 
 Governor-General of the Union of India – C. Rajagopalachari (from 21 June)
 Prime Minister of India – Jawaharlal Nehru

Events

 National income - 93,590 million
 30 January – Assassination of Mahatma Gandhi: The freedom fighter, a leader of India, Mahatma Gandhi is assassinated by Nathuram Godse.
 15 February – Junagadh and Manavadar (princely state) rescinds accession to Pakistan, and accedes to India.
 8 March - princely state of Jath accedes to India
 24 February – Referendum approves accession to India
 25 February – Accession to India in effect
 15 April – Mandi District was formed by the amalgamation of the erstwhile princely states of Mandi and Suket on the formation of Himachal Pradesh.
 1 May – First Kashmir War, India confronts the aggressors and fights the Indo-Pakistani War of 1947 and is engaged with the Dominion of Pakistan for the first time
 6 September – The Nizam of Hyderabad in Deccan having failed to retain independence decides to accede to the Dominion of Pakistan. Pakistan takes the case to the UN, pending resolutions regarding the issue.
 12 September – State of Hyderabad joins the Dominion of India

Law
Factories Act
Minimum Wages Act
Pharmacy Act
Employees' State Insurance Act
Insurance Act
Expiring Laws Continuance Act
Dock Workers (Regulation Of Employment) Act
Territorial Army Act
Census Act
Dentists Act
Diplomatic and Consular Officers (Oaths and Fees) Act
Central Silk Board Act
Rehabilitation Finance Administration Act
Industrial Finance Corporation Act
Coal Mines Provident Fund and Miscellaneous Provisions Act
Oilfields (Regulation and Development) Act
Reserve Bank (Transfer to Public Ownership) Act
National Cadet Corps Act
Electricity (Supply) Act
Mines and Minerals (Regulation and Development) Act
Resettlement Of Displaced Persons (Land Acquisition) Act

Births
7 January – Shobhaa De, columnist and novelist.
24 February – J. Jayalalithaa, actress, politician, Chief Minister of Tamil Nadu. (died 2016)
25 February – Danny Denzongpa, actor.
1 March – Gopanarayan Das, advocate and politician (died 2022).
9 April – Jaya Bachchan, actress.
3 May – S. Ramesan Nair, lyricist and poet (died 2021).
14 June – Gokaraju Ganga Raju, politician and member of parliament from Narasapuram.
10 September – Bhakti Barve, actress (died 2001).
2 October – Persis Khambatta, actress and model (died 1998).
16 October – Hema Malini, actress and dancer-choreographer.
14 November – Sindhutai Sapkal, social worker and social activist (died 2022).
30 November  K. R. Vijaya, actress.
30 November - Rajesh Vakharia, Common man.

Full date unknown
 Anant Nag, actor and politician.
 Dharanidhar Sahu, writer.

Deaths
 30 January – Mohandas Karamchand Gandhi, political and spiritual leader in India and the Indian independence movement, assassinated (born 1869).
 1 February – Jatindramohan Bagchi, poet (born 1878).
 2 April - Baba Sawan Singh, Second Satguru of Radha Soami Satsang Beas (born 1858).
 9 August – Yellapragada Subbarow, medical scientist (born 1895).

See also 
 Bollywood films of 1948

References 

 
India
Years of the 20th century in India